Codangudi (South) is a village in the Udayarpalayam taluk of Ariyalur district, Tamil Nadu, India.

Demographics 

As per the 2001 census, Codangudi (South) had a total population of 2976 with 1539 males and 1437 females.

References 

Villages in Ariyalur district